The 2017 Connacht Senior Football Championship was the 118th installment of the annual Connacht Senior Football Championship organised by Connacht GAA. It is one of the four provincial competitions of the 2017 All-Ireland Senior Football Championship. Defending champions from 2016, Galway were dethroned by Roscommon, who won their first Connacht title since 2010.

Teams
The Connacht championship is contested by the five counties in the Irish province of Connacht plus London and New York.

Bracket

Fixtures

Preliminary round

Quarter-finals

Semi-finals

Final

See also
 2017 All-Ireland Senior Football Championship
 2017 Leinster Senior Football Championship
 2017 Munster Senior Football Championship
 2017 Ulster Senior Football Championship

References

External links
 http://connachtgaa.ie/

2C
Connacht Senior Football Championship